Rewind (1971–1984) is a compilation album by English rock band The Rolling Stones, released in 1984. Coming only three years after Sucking in the Seventies, the album was primarily compiled to mark the end of the band's alliance with Warner Music (in North America) and EMI (all other territories), both of whom were the distributors of Rolling Stones Records. It is the second Rolling Stones album to include a lyric sheet (after 1978's Some Girls).

For the first time since 1969's Through the Past, Darkly (Big Hits Vol. 2), the UK and US editions of Rewind (1971–1984) would each feature different track listings, reflecting the individual tastes of both territories. The American CD version featured the US top 20 hits from 1971-1983, with the exception of "Ain't Too Proud to Beg".

Released in the summer of 1984, Rewind (1971–1984) was not as successful as previous compilations, reaching No. 23 in the UK and No. 86 in the US, though it went gold in the latter. The album marked the first official Rolling Stones CD release in the United States and featured the additional tracks "It's Only Rock'n Roll (But I Like It)" and "Doo Doo Doo Doo Doo (Heartbreaker)". The compilation was accompanied by a companion home video release, Video Rewind, released 14 November 1984.

With later compilations Jump Back: The Best of The Rolling Stones (1993) and Forty Licks (2002) superseding it, Rewind (1971–1984) eventually fell out of print.

UK track listing
All songs by Mick Jagger and Keith Richards.
"Brown Sugar" – 3:49
"Undercover of the Night" – 4:32
"Start Me Up" – 3:31
"Tumbling Dice" – 3:37
"It's Only Rock 'n Roll (But I Like It)" – 5:07
"She's So Cold" – 4:11
"Miss You" – 4:48
"Beast of Burden" – 4:27
"Fool to Cry" – 5:06
"Waiting on a Friend" – 4:34
"Angie" – 4:31
"Respectable" – 3:07

On the 1986 CD release, "Hang Fire" replaced "She's So Cold", while "Emotional Rescue" and "Doo Doo Doo Doo Doo (Heartbreaker)" were added.

US track listing
"Miss You" – 4:48
"Brown Sugar" – 3:49
"Undercover of the Night" – 4:31
"Start Me Up" – 3:31
"Tumbling Dice" – 3:37
"Hang Fire" – 2:21
"Emotional Rescue" – 5:40
"Beast of Burden" – 4:27
"Fool to Cry" – 5:05
"Waiting On a Friend" – 4:34
"Angie" – 4:31

"It's Only Rock 'N Roll (But I Like It)" and "Doo Doo Doo Doo Doo (Heartbreaker)" were added to the CD and cassette releases.

Chart positions
Album

Certification

Singles

References

Albums produced by Chris Kimsey
Albums produced by the Glimmer Twins
Albums produced by Jimmy Miller
The Rolling Stones compilation albums
1984 greatest hits albums
EMI Records compilation albums
Virgin Records compilation albums
Rolling Stones Records compilation albums